Canal 4 Navarra was a Spanish television channel, launched in 1997. It was founded and started to broadcast in 1997. Canal 4 Navarra mainly broadcast in Spanish but some programming was in Basque.

Canal 4 was closed on 29 February 2012, being substituted by the new Navarra Televisión.

External links
www.canal4.es (no longer active)

Defunct television channels in Spain
Television channels and stations established in 1997